The Luxembourg Cycling Federation, abbreviated to FSCL, is the national governing body of cycle racing in Luxembourg.

The FSCL is a member of the UCI, the UEC
and the COSL.

References

External links
 Luxembourgish Cycling Federation official website

National members of the European Cycling Union
Cycle racing in Luxembourg
Cycling
Cycle racing organizations
Strassen, Luxembourg
Sports organizations established in 1917